Fernand Point (25 February 1897 – 4 March 1955) was a French chef and restaurateur and is considered to be the father of modern French cuisine. He founded the restaurant La Pyramide in Vienne near Lyon.

Early life
He was born in Louhans, Saône-et-Loire, France. His family kept an inn where he started cooking when he was ten.

Career
He had received his training with Foyot in Paris, the Bristol Hotel, Paris, the Majestic in Cannes, and the Royal Hotel in Évian-les-Bains. In 1922, he and his family moved to Vienne, a city in southeast France near Lyon, and opened a restaurant. Two years later his father left the restaurant to Fernand, who renamed it La Pyramide.

La Pyramide

The restaurant was awarded three Michelin stars.

Ma Gastronomie

His book Ma Gastronomie was first published in French in 1969. The book includes 200 recipes based on Point's notes. The chef Charlie Trotter described Point's  Ma Gastronomie as the most important cookbook.

Publications
 Point, Fernand (2008) Ma Gastronomie, Rookery Press.

References 

1897 births
1955 deaths
People from Louhans
French chefs
Head chefs of Michelin starred restaurants
French restaurateurs